Agostina Pietrantoni (27 March 1864 - 13 November 1894) - born Livia Pietrantoni - was an Italian professed religious and a nurse from the Thourets. Pietrantoni worked in the Santo Spirito hospital in Rome where she tended to ill victims in a tuberculosis ward before a patient murdered her in 1894.

Her canonization was held on 18 April 1999 in Saint Peter's Square. The canonization cause opened on 14 December 1945 under Pope Pius XII - she was then made a Servant of God - while Pope Paul VI named her as Venerable on 19 September 1968 before he beatified her on 12 November 1972.

Life
Olivia or Livia Pietrantoni was born on 27 March 1864 in Pozzaglia Sabina - about 50 kilometres north-east of Rome - as the second of eleven children to the poor farmers Francesco Pietrantoni and Caterina Costantini. She received her Confirmation in 1868 and then made her First Communion just under a decade later in 1876.

Pietrantoni started work in 1871 and she worked doing manual labour for road construction and later in 1876 left for Tivoli with other adolescent "seasonal workers" during the winter months for the olive harvest. She refused offers of marriage - despite her mother's insistence - and so travelled to Rome with her priest uncle Matteo in January 1886 with the aim of entering a religious order in order to pursue her vocation; the Thourets declined her request when she sent a letter of admission to their generalate in Rome. Pietrantoni persisted in finding a place to pursue her call and a few months later was accepted into the Thouret order when the latter summoned her back to Rome. She bid farewell to her parents and left for Rome once more where she joined the order at Via Santa Maria in Cosmedin on 23 March 1886 and later assumed the religious name of "Agostina" as well as the habit on 13 August 1887.

Sister Agostina was sent to "Santo Spirito" Hospital in Rome as a nurse on 13 August 1887 and remained there until her death. While working in the tuberculosis ward she contracted the disease herself but recovered and so was sent to the tuberculosis ward in 1889 to tend to ill patients there. On one particular occasion she was attacked and beaten because she had seized a knife from a patient and it worried the other religious despite Pietrantoni's insistence that she was fine and would continue to work.

The male patient Giuseppe Romanelli began to harass her at this point - he even sent her death threats and on the evening of 12 November 1894 her religious asked her to take time off since the sisters worried for her; she refused. Romanelli attacked and stabbed her to death in the morning on 13 November 1894. Pietrantoni forgave her killer moments before she died to her wounds; Romanelli stabbed her in a dark corridor with three stabs at the shoulder and left arm and the jugular before a final stab in the chest. Her final words were: "Mother of mine: help me". Professor Achille Ballori (d. 1914) - who had once warned her about Romanelli - inspected her remains and observed that "Sister Agostina has allowed herself to be slaughtered like a lamb" and noted there were no contractions of either her nerves or heart. The late nun's funeral blocked the streets of Rome (thousands lined the streets and kneeled before the casket as it passed them) and a "Messaggero" report on 16 November stated that "never a more impressive spectacle was seen in Rome". Her remains were moved to the generalate on 3 February 1941 and then to her hometown on 14 November 2004.

Sainthood
The beatification process opened under Pope Pius XII on 14 December 1945 and Pietrantoni was titled as a Servant of God. The confirmation of her life of heroic virtue on 19 September 1968 allowed for Pope Paul VI to title her as Venerable; that same pope presided over her beatification on 12 November 1972 in Saint Peter's Square upon the confirmation of two miracles attributed to her intercession.

The final miracle required for sainthood was investigated and then received validation from the Congregation for the Causes of Saints on 19 March 1996. The medical board assented to this on 17 April 1997 as did theologians on 7 October 1997 and then the members of the C.C.S. on 20 January 1998. Pope John Paul II approved this miracle on 6 April 1998 and later canonized Pietrantoni as a saint of the Catholic Church on 18 April 1999.

Pietrantoni was named as the patron saint for nurses on 20 May 2003 after the Italian Episcopal Conference named her as such.

References

External links
Hagiography Circle
Santa Agostina
Saints SQPN
Catholic Online
Santi e Beati

1864 births
1894 deaths
19th-century Christian saints
19th-century Italian Roman Catholic religious sisters and nuns
Beatifications by Pope Paul VI
Canonizations by Pope John Paul II
Christian female saints of the Late Modern era
Deaths by stabbing in Italy
Italian Roman Catholic saints
Italian nurses
Italian women nurses
Italian murder victims
Murder in Rome
People from the Province of Rieti
Venerated Catholics
Female murder victims
1894 murders in Italy